General Jose Gervasio Artigas is a bronze statue, in Washington, DC, capital of the United States, at the intersection of Constitution Avenue and Virginia Avenue, at 18th Street. It is one of a set called the Statues of the Liberators. José Artigas was a 19th-century general, sometimes called "the father of Uruguayan independence", "Protector de los Pueblos Libres" or "Jefe de los Orientales".

The Washington, DC, statue was created before 1948 by Juan Manuel Blanes. At its base are engraved the words "Liberty of America is my dream and its attainment my only hope."

Although this statue was delivered before the identical one in Montevideo, Minnesota, Montevideo erected theirs in 1949 and the Washington, DC, Parks Department did not erect its until a year later on 19 June 1950.

Both statues were gifts from the people of Uruguay and are replicas of an original in San José de Mayo, Uruguay, created by Italian sculptor Dante Costa. The Uruguayan officer Edgardo Ubaldo Genta had conceived the idea in 1940 as a good-will gesture.

See also

 Artigas Mausoleum
 List of public art in Washington, D.C., Ward 2
 Statues of the Liberators

References

External links
 DCmemorials.com – Page about the Statue of Artigas at 18th and Constitution in Washington, DC 
 New York City Parks official site – Article about the statue of Artigas on 6th Avenue in SoHo
 Mooremack News official site – Article about the statue of Artigas in Montevideo, Minnesota, from the newsletter of the shipping company that carried it from Uruguay
 Smithsonian Art Inventories Catalog site of the Smithsonian's inventory and description of the statue and a brief history of it.

1950 sculptures
Bronze sculptures in Washington, D.C.
José Gervasio Artigas
Monuments and memorials in Washington, D.C.
Northwest (Washington, D.C.)
Outdoor sculptures in Washington, D.C.
Sculptures of men in Washington, D.C.
Statues in Washington, D.C.
Statues of people of the Spanish American wars of independence
United States–Uruguay relations